Carl Joachim Rohdin (born October 3, 1991) is a Swedish professional ice hockey player. He plays for Porin Ässät of the Liiga.

References

External links

1991 births
Living people
Brynäs IF players
Färjestad BK players
Karlskrona HK players
Linköping HC players
Malmö Redhawks players
Mora IK players
Swedish ice hockey right wingers
Timrå IK players
People from Gävle
Sportspeople from Gävleborg County